Razlukino is a rural locality (a village) in Golovinskoye Rural Settlement, Sudogodsky District, Vladimir Oblast, Russia. The population was 18 as of 2010.

Geography 
Razlukino is located 26 km west of Sudogda (the district's administrative centre) by road. Lnozavoda is the nearest rural locality.

References 

Rural localities in Sudogodsky District